Prochoreutis is a genus of moths in the family Choreutidae.

Species

Prochoreutis alpina (Arita, 1976)
Prochoreutis alpinoides Budashkin & Li, 2009
Prochoreutis argyrastra (Meyrick, 1932)
Prochoreutis arisema (Diakonoff, 1978)
Prochoreutis atrox (Diakonoff, 1978)
Prochoreutis bella Budashkin, 2003
Prochoreutis brunescens (Diakonoff, 1978)
Prochoreutis chionocosma (Diakonoff, 1978)
Prochoreutis clemensella (Walsingham, 1914)
Prochoreutis delicata (Arita, 1976)
Prochoreutis diakonoffi Arita, 1985
Prochoreutis drosodoxa (Meyrick, 1933)
Prochoreutis dyarella (Kearfott, 1902)
Prochoreutis extrincicella (Dyar, 1900)
Prochoreutis hadrogastra (Diakonoff, 1978)
Prochoreutis halimora (Meyrick, 1912)
Prochoreutis hestiarcha (Meyrick, 1912)
Prochoreutis holotoxa (Meyrick, 1903)
Prochoreutis inflatella (Clemens, 1863)
Prochoreutis intermediana (Rebel, 1910)
Prochoreutis kurokoi Arita, 1987
Prochoreutis miniholotoxa Budashkin, 2003
Prochoreutis monognoma (Diakonoff, 1978)
Prochoreutis myllerana (Fabricius, 1794)
Prochoreutis pernivalis (Braun, 1921)
Prochoreutis pseudostellaris Budashkin, 2003
Prochoreutis radians (Diakonoff, 1978)
Prochoreutis sachalinensis (Danilevsky, 1969)
Prochoreutis sehestediana (Fabricius, 1776)
Prochoreutis solaris (Erschoff, 1877)
Prochoreutis sororculella (Dyar, 1900)
Prochoreutis stellaris (Zeller, 1847)
Prochoreutis subdelicata Arita, 1987
Prochoreutis talyshensis (Danilevsky, 1969)
Prochoreutis ultimana (Krulikowsky, 1909)
Prochoreutis ussurica (Danilevsky, 1969)

External links
choreutidae.lifedesks.org
Prochoreutis at funet

 
Choreutidae